South Staffordshire District Council elections are held every four years. South Staffordshire District Council is the local authority for the non-metropolitan district of South Staffordshire in Staffordshire, England. Since the last boundary changes in 2003, 49 councillors have been elected from 25 wards.

Political control
The first elections were held in 1973, initially operating as a shadow authority before coming into its powers on 1 April 1974. Political control of the council since 1974 has been held by the following parties:

Leadership
The leaders of the council since 1982 have been:

Council elections
1973 South Staffordshire District Council election
1976 South Staffordshire District Council election
1979 South Staffordshire District Council election (New ward boundaries)
1983 South Staffordshire District Council election
1987 South Staffordshire District Council election
1991 South Staffordshire District Council election (New ward boundaries & district boundary changes also took place)
1995 South Staffordshire District Council election (District boundary changes took place but the number of seats remained the same)
1999 South Staffordshire District Council election
2003 South Staffordshire District Council election (New ward boundaries reduced the number of seats by one)
2007 South Staffordshire District Council election
2011 South Staffordshire District Council election
2015 South Staffordshire District Council election

By-election results

1995-1999

1999-2003

2003-2007

2007-2011

References

South Staffordshire election results
By-election results

External links
South Staffordshire District Council

 
Council elections in Staffordshire